Uslapur railway station is a Satellite Railway Station of Bilaspur Railway Station in the region of Bilaspur, Chhattisgarh in India. It is the second   most important railway stations within Bilaspur city,after Bilaspur Railway Station. Uslapur is the second biggest railway station in the Bilaspur district. Uslapur is situated west of Bilaspur city and falls under Bilaspur - Katni Section of Bilaspur Division and Trains Bypassing Bilaspur Jn Railway have halts at Uslapur Railway Station, some major trains halting at Uslapur Railway are Durg- Hazrat Nizamuddin Humsafar Express, Raipur-Lucknow Garib rath Express,Durg-Udhampur,Durg-Ajmer,Durg-Amibkapur, Sarnath Express,Betwa Express,Nautanwa Express . The station has three well-furnished railway platforms.

Connectivity to other major cities
Uslapur railway station has direct connections to the following stations: Durg, Bhilai, Raipur, Bilaspur, Anuppur, Shehdol, Umaria, Katni, Satna, Allahabad, Varanasi, Mirzapur, Balia, Chappra, Baikunthpur, Surajpur, Ambikapur, Chirmiri, Damoh, Sagar, Jhansi, Gwalior, Delhi, Jammu Tawi, Gorakhpur, Nautanwa, Ashoknagar, Guns, Kota, Ajmer, Jaipur, Jabalpur, Narsinghpur, Hoshngabad, Sehore, Bhopal, Dewas, Maksi, Ujjain, Indore, Vidisha, Rewa, Banda, Kanpur, Lucknow, Gondia, Barauni, Muzzafarpur, Maha Samund, Visakhapatnam, Bhagat Ki Kothi, Vizianagaram, Rayagada, Parvatipuram, Agra, Mathura, Naya Raipur, Itarsi, etc.

Distance of other railway stations of Bilaspur city from Uslapur station
  –  9 km
 Dadhapara – 12 km
 Ghutku – 7 km
 Chakarbhata -16 km
 Gatoura – 16 km
 Maal Godam – 6 km

Connectivity with city 
There are direct connections to the whole city. Autos are available for nearly all localities of the city. Ola cabs are running in the city. Out of 85, there are 16 city buses that connect Uslapur with other locations of the city.

Major trains
 Durg–Chhapra Sarnath Express
 Durg–Ambikapur Express
 Durg–Chirmiri Express
 Durg–Jammu Tawi Express
 Durg–Nautanwa Express (via Varanasi)
 Durg–Jaipur Weekly Express
 Bilaspur–Indore Narmada Express
 Bilaspur–Bhopal Passenger
 Bilaspur–Katni MEMU
 Bilaspur–Pendra Road MEMU
 Bilaspur–Rewa Passenger
 Bilaspur–Chirmiri Passenger
 Lucknow–Raipur Garib Rath Express
 Visakhapatnam–Bhagat Ki Kothi Express
 Barauni–Gondia Express

References

Railway stations in Bilaspur district, Chhattisgarh
Transport in Bilaspur, Chhattisgarh